The 2018 Women's Four Nations Cup was the seventh Hockey Four Nations Cup, an international women's field hockey tournament, consisting of a series of test matches. It was held in Germany, from June 15 to 18, 2017, and featured four of the top nations in women's field hockey.

Competition format
The tournament featured the national teams of China, Ireland, South Korea, and the hosts, Germany, competing in a round-robin format, with each team playing each other once. Three points were awarded for a win, one for a draw, and none for a loss.

Results

Matches

Statistics

Goalscorers
2 Goals

  Nike Lorenz 
  Marie Mävers 
  Kathryn Mullan 

1 Goal

  Liang Meiyu
  Zhong Mengling
  Sun Xiao
  Zhang Xiaoxue
  Peng Yang
  Zhao Yudiao
  Camille Nobis 
  Franzisca Hauke 
  Jana Teschke 
  Shirley McCay 
  Anna O'Flanagan 
  Roisin Upton 
  Chloe Watkins 
  Cheon Eun-bi 
  Kim Jong-eun 
  Cheon Seul-ki 
  Cho Yun-kyoung

References

2017
2017 in women's field hockey
2017 in German women's sport
2017 in Irish women's sport
2017 in Chinese women's sport
2017 in South Korean sport